Sandokan  is a fictional late 19th-century pirate created by Italian author Emilio Salgari. His adventures first appeared in publication in 1883. Sandokan is the protagonist of 11 adventure novels. Sandokan is known throughout the South China Sea as the "Tiger of Malaysia".

Sandokan series
Emilio Salgari wrote several novels chronicling the adventures of Sandokan and Yanez, two of his most legendary creations. They are introduced in The Tigers of Mompracem, which portrays their conflicts against the Dutch and British. In subsequent novels, they battle against James Brooke, the Raja of Sarawak, and also travel to India to measure themselves against the Thugs, a notorious band of stranglers devoted to the goddess Kali.

The original series

 The Mystery of the Black Jungle (I Misteri della Jungla Nera, 1895)
 The Pirates of Malaysia (I Pirati della Malesia, 1896)
 The Tigers of Mompracem (Le Tigri di Mompracem, 1900)
 The Two Tigers (Le due Tigri, 1904)
 The King of the Sea (Il Re del Mare, 1906)
 Quest for a Throne (Alla conquista di un impero, 1907)
 Sandokan to the Rescue (Sandokan alla riscossa, 1907)
 Return to Mompracem (La riconquista del Mompracem, 1908)
 The Brahman (Il Bramino dell'Assam, 1911) 
 An Empire Crumbles (La caduta di un impero, 1911) (published posthumously)
 Yanez' Revenge (La rivincita di Yanez, 1913) (published posthumously)

Follow-up works
Other Sandokan titles were written by Italian authors Luigi Motta, Emilio Fancelli and by Salgari's son Omar.
Paco Ignacio Taibo II has written a recent Sandokan novel entitled The Return of the Tigers of Malaysia.
Gianni Padoan wrote a series of novels that are declaredly a sci-fi reinterpretation of the Tigers of Malaysia series by Emilio Salgari: I misteri della stella nera (Mondadori 1978), I pirati della galassia (Mondadori 1978), Le tigri di Moonpracer (Mondadori 1979), Alla conquista di Rigel (Mondadori 1980).

Fictional biography
Sandokan is the son of Kaigadan, the last of a dynasty of rulers of Borneo, whose parents were killed by the East India Company in a bid to seize the throne. Having sworn revenge, Sandokan assembles a group of rebel pirates, the Tigers of Mompracem (now Pulau Kuraman), to attack them, and earns the personal name of the Tiger of Malaysia. Stranded in Labuan, Sandokan is recovering of his wounds in the house of  Lord James Guillonk, when he meets the lord's niece Marianna, the "Pearl of Labuan", with whom he falls in love. Sandokan escapes, but reunites with Marianna and later marries her. After his defeat, Sandokan stills frees his men from jail and apparently gives up piracy and escapes to Java with his wife.

Sandokan and his friend Yanez De Gomera go on to help Kammamuri fight James Brooke, the "Exterminator", the White Rajah of Sarawak, so as to free Tremal-Naik. Sandokan later has to help Tremal-Naik again, when his daughter is kidnapped by the Thugs of the Kali, a sect of killers commanded by Suyodhana, the "Tiger of India".

Following many battles over a period of years, Sandokan defeats all of his enemies and retires as rajah of Kini Balù (Ambong and Marudu). His friend Yanez is appointed rajah of Assam.

Characteristics 
Sandokan character is inspired by the Spanish naval captain Carlos Cuarteroni Fernández. He is depicted by Salgari as a gallant pirate. He is described as tall, charming, very muscular, slender, and attractive, with cold, black eyes, a fierce and severe look, and a big turban on his head. Unlike his troops, who are described as mostly half-naked, Sandokan always wears fine oriental clothes, generally red silk with embroidered gold, and long, red, leather boots.

Sandokan is a formidable fighter, brave, and ruthless with his enemies, but kind, generous, and faithful to his friends. He has absolute leadership over his men, and is often shown as having no fear, with Yanez playing as a sort of counterweight to his impulsive nature.

Related characters
 Sandokan, also known as the Tiger of Malaysia, a Bornean king turned pirate
 Lady Marianna Guillonk, also known as the Pearl of Labuan, Sandokan's Italian-English wife
 Yanez De Gomera: Sandokan's loyal friend and comrade, Portuguese, Goan
 James Brooke, the White Rajah of Sarawak, their worst enemy
 Lord James Guillonk, Marianna's father, wants to kill Sandokan
 Tremal-Naik, Indian from Bengal
 Kammamuri, Tremal-Naik's servant

Films
The first Sandokan films were made in 1941 in Italy with Luigi Pavese as Sandokan.

 Pirates of Malaya (I pirati della Malesia) (dir. Enrico Guazzoni)
 The Two Tigers (Le due tigri) (dir. Giorgio Simonelli)

A series of Italian-made films with American leads were filmed in 1964 and released internationally.

 Sandokan the Great (Sandokan, la tigre di Mompracem) (1964),  starring Steve Reeves (dir. Umberto Lenzi)
 Sandokan - The Pirate of Malaysia (I pirati della Malesia) (1964)  Pirates of the Seven Seas, starring Steve Reeves (dir. Umberto Lenzi)
 Sandokan to the Rescue (Sandokan alla riscossa) (1964)  Sandokan Fights Back, starring Ray Danton (dir. Luigi Capuano)
 Sandokan Against the Leopard of Sarawak (Sandokan contro il leopardo di Sarawak) (1964)  Return of Sandokan , starring Ray Danton (dir. Luigi Capuano)

A pair of Italian films featuring a character named "Sandok" were filmed based on the character by Salgari.

 Temple of the White Elephant ( Sandok, il Maciste della giungla) with Mimmo Palmara as Sandok (1964, dir. Umberto Lenzi)
 The Mountain of Light,  Jungle Adventurer, with Richard Harrison (1965, dir. Umberto Lenzi)

A 1970 Italian-Spanish film The Tigers of Mompracem was made with Ivan Rassimov as Sandokan

TV miniseries

In 1976, Indian actor Kabir Bedi played the lead in Sandokan, a six-part miniseries for European television directed by Sergio Sollima. Carole André was cast as Lady Marianna Guillonk, Philippe Leroy played Sandokan's trusted friend and lieutenant Yanez De Gomera. The role of the main antagonist James Brooke was performed by Adolfo Celi.

In 1977, Kabir Bedi reprised his role in the film La tigre è ancora viva: Sandokan alla riscossa! (The Tiger Lives Again: Sandokan To The Rescue!). The TV series theme song, "Sandokan", was composed by Oliver Onions (a pseudonym of the De Angelis brothers), and made the top 10 in many European countries, albeit mostly in the translated English version.

A 2004 documentary, Sandokan's Adventure, detailed the making of the series.

Two further television series were made The Return of Sandokan in 1996 and The Son of Sandokan in 1998, with Kabir Bedi again reprising his role.

Animated series

Sandokan the animated series was released in 1992 by Spanish animation studio BRB International, and broadcast in the United Kingdom on Channel 4 and Republic of Ireland on RTE Two. This children's animated show, written by Doug Stone and Dave Mallow, is loosely based on Salgari's novels. In the show, Sandokan (here an anthropomorphized tiger) is an usurped prince who travels the seas as a pirate seeking to reclaim his rightful throne from the Rajah of Sarawak. The first nine episodes of the series are available in three DVD volumes in the United Kingdom. A condensed version of the series was released as an animated movie, The Princess and the Pirate, in 1995.

Another animated series was released in 1998 from a coproduction among RAI on 1993-94, SEK Studio, and Mondo TV and broadcast in Italy on Rai 1.
The adventures of this 26-episode cartoon series are based on the stories of  Emilio Salgari. The story takes place in the second half of the 19th century, and is situated in the Malaysian archipelago, Borneo, and India. Co-produced with RAI Italy and TF1 France, the series achieved a big success such that it a second series was decided to be produced on this character. An interactive computer game, a video special, a sticker album, along with other merchandising articles such as books, toys, shirts, bags, etc. based on the series are now available.

References

External links

Watch some episodes of the Sandokan animated series on Roh Press
Read a review of the 1960s Sandokan films
Read the first three chapters of Sandokan: The Tigers of Mompracem
The Tiger of Malaysia, Barga News
Read a review of Sandokan: The Tigers of Mompracem at SBTB.com.
Read a review at Pirates and Privateers

Literary characters introduced in 1883
Novels by Emilio Salgari
Italian novels adapted into television shows
Television shows based on Italian novels
Fictional pirates
Adventure film characters
Italian children's animated television series
Spanish children's animated television series
Fictional tigers
Fictional princes
Fictional Malaysian people
Channel 4 original programming
Italian adventure novels
Malaysia in fiction
Characters in Italian novels